JSC Arsenal AD is a Bulgarian joint-stock company based in Kazanlak, engaged primarily in the manufacture of firearms and military equipment. It is Bulgaria's oldest arms supplier.

History 
The company's history can be traced back to 1878 with the first armory in the country - the Ruse Artillery Arsenal. Due to strategic concerns, it was relocated to Sofia in 1891. After the nation's defeat in the Second Balkan War and World War I, in 1924 the company and all of its equipment were relocated in Kazanlak, a town situated in central Bulgaria. The armory was given the name  ("State Military Factory").

Initially producing only artillery gun components and ammunition, the factory later began to manufacture gas masks (1920s), nitroglycerin (1930s), machine tools (1940s) and finally assault rifles, optic sights and B-10 recoilless rifles (1950s). The first assault rifle, a direct copy of the Soviet AK-47, was produced in 1958. By the 1960s, a total of seven factories were under the company's jurisdiction. Until the Fall of Communism in 1989-1990, the company was named Mashinostroitelen kombinat Fridrikh Engels ("Friedrich Engels Machinery Works") to conceal its activities as a military enterprise. As part of this strategy, it adopted the manufacture of various civilian products, including automobiles such as the then-popular Bulgarrenault-8. In the late 1980s and early 1990s, Arsenal began cooperation with companies from Japan, Sweden, Ukraine and Germany.

Currently, Arsenal AD is a private company conducting international arms trade, although it also expands its civilian exports, now including high-precision metalworking machinery, mobile robot manipulators and synthetic diamonds.

Military production

Pistols 
 Arsenal Compact

Submachine guns 
 Shipka SMG (9×18mm Makarov / 9×19mm Parabellum)

Assault rifles 

 AR-M1 / AR-M1F - improved AK-47 copy with an AK-74 front sight base, flash suppressor, black polymer stock set, luminous spots on the iron sights and a rail for mounting optics. The -F model features a folding stock. Chambered in 5.56×45mm NATO and 7.62×39mm.
 AR-M2 / AR-M2F - improved AK-47 copy like the AR-M1/AR-M1F, but with a shortened barrel, AKS-74U front sight base and muzzle booster/flash suppressor hybrid.
 AR-M4SF - extremely short development of the AKS-74 with red dot sight, provision to mount a night vision or laser sight. Chambered in 5.56×45mm NATO and 7.62×39mm.
 AR-M7F - improved AK-47 copy like the AR-M1, but with an AK-101-style folding stock.
 AR-M9 / AR-M9F - improved AK-47 copy like the AR-M1/AR-M1F, features a thumb-operable fire selector and a different style polymer stock set. AR-M9F uses a NATO length right side folding tubular stock. Unlike most AK folding variants that have left side folding stocks. The advantages a right side folder has over a left allows the optic mount to remain on the weapon when folded. Instead of having to remove the optic mount to latch the stock. The AR-M9F can still be fired from a folded position as the reciprocating charging handle clears the stock. The selector lever can also still be used since the left side incorporates the thumb selector lever on left side of grip. AR-M9F civilian base rifle counterpart in semiautomatic is the SAR-M9F (modified and sold as SAM7SF-84 in the US market to meet import restrictions).
 AR-1 / AR-1F - improved AK-47 copies with black polymer lining and luminous sights. 
 AR-SF - based on AKS-74U with laser aim indicator. Chambered in 5.56×45mm NATO and 7.62×39mm.

Light Machine Guns 
 LMG/LMG-F - RPK variants in 7.62×39mm, 5.45×39mm or 5.56×45mm NATO chambering

General Purpose Machine Guns 
 Arsenal MG series - different versions of the PK machine gun, all with polymer lining and slightly higher muzzle velocity;

Grenade launchers 

 Lavina - 40mm semi-automatic revolver-type grenade launcher;
 Arsenal MSGL - 40×46mm multi-shot grenade launcher; somewhat similar to the Milkor MGL
 UBGL series - underbarrel grenade launchers for all AR and AK series of assault rifles, the Bushmaster M4 Type Carbine, M4 carbine and M16 rifles
 ATGL-L - a lighter RPG-7 version with a more powerful warhead and a red dot sight;
 ATGL-H - a heavier SPG-9 copy with a higher muzzle velocity;
 AGL-30M - a heavier, more durable variant of the AGS-17 Plamya

Mortars 
 M60MA - 60mm mortar
 M60CMA - 60mm commando mortar (handheld)
 M81MA - 81mm mortar
 M82MA - 82mm mortar

Air Defense Systems 
 ADS - ZU-23-2 variant with advanced sights and a computerized fire control system
 ADS-N - Navy version

Other firearms and products 
 BARR series - bolt-action hunting rifles, based on AK series;
 SAR series - semi-automatic hunting rifles
 HE-FRAG and flash bang grenades

Munitions 
 Small arms ammunitions - 9x18, 9x19, 5.56x45, 7.62x39, 7.62x51, 7.62x54
 Artillery rounds - 23x115, 23x152, 30x165, 
 Rounds for grenade launchers - 30mm, 40mm, 40x46mm
 Rounds for anti-tank systems - RPG-7, SPG-9, BMP 73mm
 Mortar bombs - 60mm, 81mm, 82mm and 120mm
 Hand grenades
 Unguided aviation rockets
 Anti-tank mines

Other products 
 Computer Numerical Control (CNC) equipment
 Cemented Carbide Inserts
 Cemented Carbide Tips
 Cemented Carbide Special Tools
 Hunting Powders "Sokol", "Mars", "Magia"
 Nitrocellulose for Lacquer Production
 Nitrocellulose for Dynamite Production

See also 
 TEREM, another Bulgarian arms manufacturing company
 Mars Armor Ltd, a Bulgarian ballistic protection manufacturing company
 Defense industry of Bulgaria

References

External links
 Official website
 History of Arsenal AD
 Arsenal, Inc. (US importer)
 Blue Book Publication: ARSENAL, BULGARIA companyinformation (archiveversion)

Defence companies of Bulgaria
Companies established in 1878
Kazanlak